Paul Adam may refer to:

Paul Adam (French novelist) (1862–1920)
Paul Adam (German soldier) (1892–1969)
Paul Adam (English novelist) (born 1958), English journalist and novelist
Paul Adam (music) (born 1964), British songwriter
Jean-Pierre-Paul Adam, French actor

See also
 Paul Adams (disambiguation)